Lasionectria is a genus of fungi in the class Sordariomycetes. It consists of six species.

References

Sordariomycetes genera
Bionectriaceae
Taxa named by Pier Andrea Saccardo